Macrococcus lamae is a species of bacteria belonging to the genus Macrococcus. Strains of this species were originally isolated from the skin of llamas.

References

External links
Type strain of Macrococcus lamae at BacDive -  the Bacterial Diversity Metadatabase

Staphylococcaceae
Bacteria described in 2003